Hila Klein (born December 12, 1986) is an Israeli-American YouTuber, designer, and businesswoman. She is known for co-creating the channel h3h3Productions—on which she is a host alongside her husband, Ethan Klein—and is also the founding CEO of American streetwear brand Teddy Fresh.

Early life and education
Klein was born in Tel Aviv, Israel, on December 12, 1986, and was raised in Holon. Her father is a Maghrebi Jew (from Libya) and her mother is a Mizrahi Jew (from Turkey); Klein also has distant Ashkenazi Jewish roots, as well as having distant ancestry tracing to Italy and Spain.  She has three brothers, including Los Angeles–based artist Moses Hacmon, who is married to fellow YouTuber Trisha Paytas.

Career

h3h3Productions

Klein and husband Ethan Klein began creating videos for YouTube under the banner of h3h3Productions in 2011. The Kleins later expanded their content creating several channels including the H3 Podcast. The Kleins were featured as videogame characters in a Payday 2 DLC, with the proceeds funding their defence of a copyright infringement lawsuit filed against the channel.

Teddy Fresh 

Klein founded the Los Angeles based street wear brand Teddy Fresh in 2017 and is currently the CEO and principal designer.

The brand has collaborated with animated series, SpongeBob SquarePants and Rick and Morty, as well as with singer Elton John and Care Bears. In 2021, Teddy Fresh hosted a pop-up event in Los Angeles for its collaboration with Looney Tunes.

Personal life
She first met Ethan Klein in Israel, at the Holocaust Yad Vashem Museum during her service in the Israel Defense Forces in 2007. The couple married in October 2012. They have two sons,  born in 2019 and 2022.

The Kleins currently live in Bel Air, California, U.S. She became a naturalized U.S. citizen in 2019.

Notes

References

1987 births
Living people
Israeli female comedians
Israeli emigrants to the United States
Israeli YouTubers
American Sephardic Jews
Israeli fashion designers
Israeli women fashion designers
American fashion designers
American women fashion designers
Israeli people of Libyan-Jewish descent
Israeli people of Turkish-Jewish descent
Israeli Sephardi Jews
Naturalized citizens of the United States
Jewish fashion designers